Davey Brozowski (born October 17, 1982) is a drummer and percussionist from Seattle, WA. He has toured with Modest Mouse as their percussionist. Other acts include Cayucas, The Catheters, Black Whales, and Tall Birds. In 2010, Brozowski also toured with Broken Bells as their live percussionist alongside Brian Burton aka Dangermouse. He also played drums during the set whenever Burton would move to keyboards or guitar.

Brozowski plays a sit down style cocktail kit with Modest Mouse that is modeled after a Rogers Parklane and custom made by C&C Drums.

References 

Musicians from Seattle
American drummers
American percussionists
Living people
1982 births
21st-century American drummers